Blodgett can refer to:

People
Blodgett (surname)

Places
In the United States:
Blodgett, Missouri
Blodgett, Oregon
Blodgett Canyon in southwestern Montana
Blodgett Landing, New Hampshire, a census-designated area

Structures

In the United States:
Delos A. Blodgett House, Daytona Beach, Florida, built in 1896
Bacon-Gleason-Blodgett Homestead, Bedford, Massachusetts, built in 1740
William Blodgett House, Newton, Massachusetts, built in 1875
Lydia Blodgett Three-Decker, Worcester, Massachusetts, built in 1902
Blodgett Hospital in western Michigan, part of the Spectrum Health group
Roscommon County–Blodgett Memorial Airport, a public airport in Michigan